Panjiangjie is an interchange station on lines 1 and 10 of the Shenyang Metro. The line 1 station opened on 27 September 2010, and the line 10 station opened on 29 April 2020.

Station Layout

References 

Railway stations in China opened in 2010
Shenyang Metro stations